North Quay ferry wharf is located on the northern side of the Brisbane River serving the Brisbane central business district in Queensland, Australia. It is served by RiverCity Ferries' CityCat and CityHopper services.

History 
The wharf was destroyed during the January 2011 Brisbane floods. A temporary replacement opened on 18 April 2011. The temporary wharf closed on 9 March 2015 to allow a new permanent wharf to be built. The new wharf opened on 15 June 2015.

Location
The wharf is located off Queens Wharf Road and connect directly to the Bicentennial Bikeway. It is the closest ferry wharf to the Queen Street Mall and the rest of the Brisbane central business district. It lies under and to the south of the CBD end of the Victoria Bridge.

References

External links

Brisbane central business district
Ferry wharves in Brisbane